The men's 400 metres at the 2013 European Athletics Junior Championships was held in Rieti on 18 and 19 July.

Medalists

Records
Prior to the competition, the existing world junior and championship records were as follows.

Schedule

Results

Heats
Qualification: First 3 in each heat (Q) and 4 best performers (q) advance to the semifinals.

Semifinals
Qualification: First 3 in each heat (Q) and 2 best performers (q) advance to the final.

Final
Wind:

References

400 metres
400 metres